St Aloysius College is a private, coeducational, Jesuit college located in Mangaluru, Karnataka, India. With a 2016–2017 enrollment of 4183 undergraduate students and 1532 postgraduate students and 69 research scholars, the college specializes in academic programs in the humanities, commerce, science, technology, and management.

The National Assessment and Accreditation Council (NAAC) awarded St. Aloysius College with a cumulative grade point average (CGPA) of 3.62 out of 4.0 in the third cycle of accreditation in March 2015. The college has been sanctioned ‘DDU Kaushal Centre’ for the years 2015-17 under the 12th Plan Scheme by the Govt of India.

The college is awarded STAR Status under Dept of Biotechnology, Govt of India and is extended to the second phase. It has also been recognised as a 'College with Potential for Excellence' by the University Grants Commission (UGC) also for the second phase. The college has been sanctioned Community College Scheme by UGC and the state government has given grants to the college to start the Biotechnology Finishing School (BTFS).

In April 2017, the Ministry of Human Resource Development (MHRD), Government of India, ranked St. Aloysius College, under the National Institutional Ranking Framework (NIRF) 2017, at 44 among the best colleges of the country and #2 college in Karnataka.

History 
Founded in 1880, the college's name reflects its early history as a liberal arts college and preparatory school (now St. Aloysius College High School) on the same campus. It was affiliated to the University of Madras in 1880.

In 1955, the college was affiliated to the newly established Karnatak University.

In 1999, the college launched its first full-fledged master's program, Master of Computer Application (MCA), followed by Master of Business Administration (MBA) in 2004. This led to the inauguration of a new campus on the outskirts of Mangaluru known as Aloysius Institute of Management and Information Technology (AIMIT) in 2008.

In 2007, the college was granted autonomous status and has been conducting its day-to-day activities under the autonomous system ever since. The current Principal of St. Aloysius College is Praveen Martis. 

The motto of this college is "Lucet et Ardet" - Latin for "Shine to Enkindle". The motto mainly refers to the qualities of the mind and the heart. It is the deep desire of the Alma Mater to present to the world, men and women with knowledge and creativity and hearts burning with genuine love and concern for others.

Courses
As of 2017, the college is both an undergraduate college and a post-graduate college with 4138 undergraduate students and 1532 postgraduate students. 

The college offers 17 post-graduate courses.  St. Aloysius College Advanced Research Centre is affiliated to Tumkur University.  It was inaugurated by Prof Balaram on 02-06-2012.  There are 53 research scholars working for the Ph.D. under these guides.  PG Department of Chemistry and PG Department of Management (MBA) have successfully completed six months of course work for seven and six research students during 2013-14.

Notable alumni

 Aravind Adiga, winner of the Man Booker Prize
 Anant Agarwal, Padma Shri recipient, MIT professor, and edX CEO
 George Fernandes, former Union Defence Minister
 K. V. Kamath, chairman, ICICI Bank, India
 Mavila Vishwanathan Nair, chairman, Union Bank of India
 Brian J. G. Pereira, M.D.
 V. J. P. Saldanha, Konkani language littérateur, dramatist, novelist, and poet
 Deepa Sannidhi, actress
 Devi Prasad Shetty, surgeon and philanthropist
 Kottayan Katankot Venugopal, senior advocate, Supreme Court of India
 Joachim Alva, lawyer, writer, and politician
 K. L. Rahul, Indian international cricketer
 Srinidhi Ramesh Shetty, actress
 V. G. Siddhartha, founder-owner of the chain of Cafe Coffee Day outlets.
 Prabhu Mundkur, actor
 Sukumar Azhikode, Writer, Orator
 Govind Padmasoorya, actor and television presenter
 T.M.A Pai, founder of Manipal University

See also
 List of Jesuit sites
2008 anti-Christian attacks in Carnataca
Christianity in Karnataka

References

External links

 

Colleges of Mangalore University
Jesuit universities and colleges in India
Universities and colleges in Mangalore
Educational institutions established in 1880
1880 establishments in British India
British colonial architecture in India
Academic institutions formerly affiliated with the University of Madras